This is the complete filmography of actress Karin Booth (June 19, 1916 – July 27, 2003). Originally from Minneapolis, Minnesota, she entered films in 1941 and retired in 1964. She often appeared in westerns, musicals, and, occasionally, dramas.

Filmography

References

External links
 

American filmographies
Actress filmographies